The 105th Regiment of Foot (Queen's Own Royal Regiment of Highlanders) was a short-lived British line infantry regiment. It was raised in Perthshire by Major-General David Graeme as a two-battalion regiment on 15 October 1760 by converting independent companies. It was named after Charlotte of Mecklenburg-Strelitz, who had been selected as the wife for the future George III of Great Britain. The regiment served in Ireland and was disbanded in 1763.

References

Infantry regiments of the British Army
Military units and formations established in 1760
Military units and formations disestablished in 1763